"Cry Softly" is a song written by Buddy Killen, Billy Sherrill, and Glenn Sutton.  It is based on Liebesträume by Franz Liszt. Nancy Ames originally recorded the song in 1966  Her version reached No. 95 on the Billboard Hot 100.

Cover versions
Andy Williams included a version on his 1974 album You Lay So Easy on My Mind.  The song reached #20 on the adult contemporary chart in 1975.

References

1966 songs
1966 singles
1975 singles
Songs written by Buddy Killen
Songs written by Billy Sherrill
Songs written by Glenn Sutton
Andy Williams songs
Columbia Records singles